Bellator 287: Piccolotti vs. Barnaoui (also known as Bellator Milan) was a mixed martial arts event produced by Bellator MMA, that took place on October 29, 2022, at the Allianz Cloud Arena in Milan, Italy.

Background 
Bellator will return to Milan for the first time since a three-card stint in September and October 2020, and will mark the first fan-attended show there since October 2019.

A lightweight bout between Adam Piccolotti and promotional newcomer Mansour Barnaoui headlined the event.

A middleweight bout between Steven Hill and Walter Pugliesi was booked for this event, but Pugliesi was forced to pull out due to personal issues and was replaced by Andrea Fusi in a catchweight bout at 82 kg. 

A heavyweight bout between Denis Stojnić and Oleg Popov was scheduled for this event, however the bout was called citing "Covid-19 protocols". Days later, Stojnić was arrested as part of mass arrests of individuals involved in an organized crime ring.

Results

See also 

 2022 in Bellator MMA
 List of Bellator MMA events
 List of current Bellator fighters
 Bellator MMA Rankings

References 

Bellator MMA events
Events in Milan
2022 in mixed martial arts
2022 in Italian sport
Sports competitions in Milan
October 2022 sports events in Italy
2020s in Milan